François-Xavier Bustillo O.F.M. Conv. is a Spanish prelate of the Catholic Church who has been the Bishop of Ajaccio since 2021. He is a member of the Conventual Franciscans.

Biography

François-Xavier Bustillo was born in Pamplona in Navarre, Spain, and was ordained a Franciscan priest in 1994.

After his studies at the Istituto Teologico di Sant'Antonio, he obtained his doctorate at the Catholic University of Toulouse.

In 1994 he was one of the founders of the Saint Bonaventure's Convent in Narbonne. From 2006 to 2018 he held the position of Provincial Custos of the Conventual Franciscans for France and Belgium, and from 2005 to 2018 carried out his ministry in the diocese of Carcassonne-Narbonne.

In 2018 he was appointed guardian of the convent of Saint-Maximilien-Kolbe in Lourdes, France.

On 11 May 2021, Pope Francis appointed him Bishop of Ajaccio. He received his episcopal consecration on 13 June in the cathedral in Ajaccio from Jean-Marc Aveline, Archbishop of Marseilles.

In February 2022, after Paris-Match reported that Bustillo was one of the leading candidates for the position of Archbishop of Paris, he said he had not been contacted and that it was not Church practice to move a bishop so soon. It said it would be "unfair": "Paris needs a man of experience. What I really want is to be here, with you and for you."

In April 2022, Pope Francis gave an Italian-language version of Bustillo's book Witnesses, Not Officials to each of the priests attending the Chrism Mass in St. Peter's Basilica on Holy Thursday.

Publications 
 La fraternità pasquale. Raccontare la vita comunitaria, in Memoria e profezia, EMP, 2013, 
 La vocation du prêtre face aux crises: La fidélité créatrice, Bruyères-le-Châtel, Éditions Nouvelle Cité, 2021,

References
 

1968 births
Bishops of Ajaccio
Living people
21st-century Roman Catholic bishops in France
People from Pamplona
Spanish Roman Catholic bishops
Spanish Franciscans
Conventual Franciscan bishops
Spanish expatriates in France
Bishops appointed by Pope Francis